Giorgio Contini (born 4 January 1974) is a former Swiss football manager and former player who currently managed Swiss Super League club Grasshopper Club Zürich.

Playing career

Teams
He played at various clubs in Switzerland, such as FC Winterthur, FC St. Gallen, FC Luzern and FC Lausanne-Sport. His greatest success was the Swiss championships with FC St. Gallen in 1999/2000. In summer 2005, he ended his footballing career.

National
Contini played his only international match for Switzerland in a friendly match against Poland, on 28 February 2001.

Coaching career

After retiring as soccer player, Contini started his coaching career at FC Oberwinterthur, who played in the 2. Liga Interregional, in 2005. In the following year, he joined FC St. Gallen as coach of the second team. He remained at St. Gallen until 2011. During his time there, he also assisted in coaching the first team, from 2006 until 2007, under Rolf Fringer, and also served as interim coach in 2011. He joined FC Luzern in 2011 as assistant coach, under Murat Yakin. 

In late 2012, he was hired by FC Vaduz as head coach, where he remained until June 2017. The following season, he rejoined FC St. Gallen as head coach, this time, for one year. From 2018 until 2021, he was head coach of FC Lausanne-Sport, whom he led to promotion to the Swiss Super League in 2020. 

On June 9 2021, he was confirmed as the new head coach of Grasshopper Club Zürich.

On 19 March 2023, Swiss online news site nau.ch reported that Contini had handed in his resignation in mid February, which would see him leaving the club in the summer, following a six month notice period. On the same day, the club confirmed the news and stating their intention of continuing their cooperation for the duration of the season. This news came on the heels of Contini's GC having won two games in a row for the first time that season.

Honours

Player

FC St. Gallen
Swiss Champions (1): 1999-00

Manager

FC Vaduz
Swiss Challenge League (1): 2014
Liechtenstein Football Cup (4): 2013, 2014, 2015, 2016

FC Lausanne-Sport
Swiss Challenge League (1): 2020
Individual
Liechtensteiner Coach of the Year (2): 2014, 2016

Personal life
Contini is of Italian descent.

References

Swiss men's footballers
Switzerland international footballers
Swiss people of Italian descent
Swiss Super League players
FC Luzern players
1974 births
Living people
Swiss football managers
FC Luzern managers
FC St. Gallen managers
FC Vaduz managers
Grasshopper Club Zürich managers
Swiss Super League managers
Association football forwards